Stephen Arnold Douglas Behel  (November 6, 1860 – February 15, 1945) was a Major League Baseball player. He played nine games for the Milwaukee Brewers of the Union Association in 1884 and fifty-nine games for the New York Metropolitans of the American Association in 1886. He also played for a number of minor league teams, primarily in the Northwestern League, between 1883 and 1888.

Sources

Major League Baseball outfielders
Milwaukee Brewers (UA) players
New York Metropolitans players
19th-century baseball players
Baseball players from Illinois
Milwaukee Brewers (minor league) players
Fort Wayne Hoosiers players
Augusta Browns players
Eau Claire Lumbermen players
Eau Claire (minor league baseball) players
Rockford (minor league baseball) players
1860 births
1945 deaths